The 2016 Connacht Senior Football Championship will be the 117th installment of the annual Connacht Senior Football Championship held under the auspices of Connacht GAA. It is one of the four provincial competitions of the 2016 All-Ireland Senior Football Championship. Mayo entered the competition as defending champions but were beaten by Galway in the semi-finals. Galway went on to win their first title in eight years by beating Roscommon after a replay.	

Due to Covid-19 it's still last meeting of Mayo hosting London and Roscommon day for New York there 2021 meetings were both cancelled before the draws had taken place the next time we will see those rotational fixtures will possibly in 2026.

Teams
The Connacht championship is contested by the five counties in the Irish province of Connacht and the two foreign based teams of London and New York.

Bracket

Fixtures

Preliminary round

Quarter-finals

Semi-finals

Final

See also
 2016 All-Ireland Senior Football Championship
 2016 Leinster Senior Football Championship
 2016 Munster Senior Football Championship
 2016 Ulster Senior Football Championship

References

2C
Connacht Senior Football Championship